Why Be Blue is the fourth studio album by Suicide, originally released in 1992 by Brake Out Records. It was reissued on Mute Records Blast First sub-label in 2005 containing a new remix of the entire album by keyboardist Martin Rev, a revised track order, new artwork, plus an additional disc of live material from 1989.

Track listing

2005 Track listing
Disc 1 - Remixed by Martin Rev

Disc 2 - Live at Le Palace, Paris / 17 April 1989

Personnel
Adapted from the Why Be Blue liner notes.
Suicide
 Martin Rev – keyboards, drum programming
 Alan Vega – vocals
Production and additional personnel
 David Heglmeier – engineering
 Brad Johnson – mastering
 Ric Ocasek – production

Release history

References

External links 
 

1992 albums
Suicide (band) albums
Albums produced by Ric Ocasek
Mute Records albums